Sarojini Ballah, The Right Honorable Lady Jugnauth (commonly known as Lady Sarojini Jugnauth), a former Spouse of the Prime Minister of Mauritius is the widow of Sir Anerood Jugnauth. She previously held the position  from 1982 to 1995 and from 2000 to 2003, most recently from 2014 to 2017. She was the First Lady of Mauritius from 2003 to 2012 when her husband served as President of the country. She is a primary school teacher by profession and is the mother of Shalini Malhotra and Pravind Jugnauth.

She took an active role in social activities being the patron of various charitable organizations and also participates in various political activities in support of her family and party. Over the years, she generally retained a high approval rate as wife of the prime minister. She became a subject of controversy in 1992 when the bank of Mauritius issued a Rs. 20 note with her effigy on it. The inauguration of the note was done by her husband and other members of the government. 

Due to various pressure from other political parties and unpopularity of then government, the note was subsequently removed from circulation while prime minister Jugnauth apologized in parliament stating that it was a mistake for which he was terribly sorry. The government collapsed in 1995 after losing the general elections.

Personal life
Sarojini Ballah married Sir Anerood Jugnauth on 18 December 1956. They have two children, Shalini (Mrs Malhotra) and Pravind who is the current Prime Minister. She is the grandmother of five grandchildren that is Anusha, Divya, Sonika, Sonali and Sara.

References

Living people
Mauritian people of Indian descent
Spouses of prime ministers of Mauritius
First ladies and gentlemen of Mauritius
People from Plaines Wilhems District
1938 births
Wives of knights